George Russell Buckle (1886 – 10 April 1957) was an English professional golfer. He was the son of William Buckle, who was the professional at Church Stretton from 1900 to 1911.

Buckle tied for 9th place in the 1920 Open Championship. He was one of the runners-up in the 1925 Daily Mail Tournament at Notts Golf Club, one shot behind the winner, Charles Johns.

Buckle won the Midland Professional Championship four times and was runner-up on five other occasions. In 1926 he won the West of England Professional Championship at Long Ashton by 6 strokes.

Professional wins
1912 Midland Professional Championship
1923 Midland Professional Championship
1925 Midland Professional Championship
1926 West of England Professional Championship
1929 Midland Professional Championship

Results in major championships

Note: Buckle only played in The Open Championship.

NT = No tournament
WD = withdrew
CUT = missed the half-way cut
"T" indicates a tie for a place

References

English male golfers
People from Nutfield, Surrey
Sportspeople from Surrey
1886 births
1957 deaths